The Flyspot Rocks are rocks rising  above sea level, lying  northwest of the Terra Firma Islands in Marguerite Bay. The rocks are ice covered on the south sides but mainly ice free on their northern sides. They were probably first sighted in 1909 by the French Antarctic Expedition under Jean-Baptiste Charcot who, from a position slightly northwestward, charted a "doubtful" island in essentially this position. The group was roughly sketched from the air by the British Graham Land Expedition (BGLE) on a flight of February 1, 1937. They were visited and surveyed in 1949 by the Falkland Islands Dependencies Survey. The name arose at an earlier date because of their indistinct appearance as represented on the BGLE map.

References 

Rock formations of Graham Land
Fallières Coast